Patrick Quirk Caples (c.1830–27 November 1904) was a New Zealand gold prospector, explorer and mine director. He was born in Bilboa, County Limerick, Ireland on c.1830.

References

1830s births
1904 deaths
New Zealand gold prospectors
Irish emigrants to New Zealand (before 1923)
People of the Otago Gold Rush